Elgort is a British surname. Notable people with the surname include:

Ansel Elgort (born 1994), American actor, singer, and DJ
Arthur Elgort (born 1940), American fashion photographer, father of Ansel

See also
Elgart